Polytaxis may refer to:
 Polytaxis (plant), a genus of flowering plants in the family Asteraceae
 Polytaxis (foraminifera), a genus of foraminifers in the family